Ethmia wellingi is a moth in the family Depressariidae. It is found in Mexico. Records from Costa Rica refer to Ethmia stephenrumseyi.

The ground color of the forewings is white, with distinctly defined, dark brownish black markings reflecting greenish blue. The ground color of the hindwings is whitish, becoming pale brownish on the distal half.

References

Moths described in 1973
wellingi